These hits topped the Ultratop 50 in 1998.

See also
1998 in music

References

1998 in Belgium
1998 record charts
1998